Company of Heroes is a 2013 American direct-to-video war thriller film directed by Don Michael Paul. The screenplay was co-written by Danny Bilson and Paul De Meo. It was loosely based on the video game of the same name. De Meo would later write Company of Heroes 2.

Plot
With the Germans apparently near defeat in the latter part of World War II, a squad of American soldiers from the 2nd Infantry Division on a routine mission near Elsenborn in the Belgian Ardennes encounter a surprisingly strong German tank destroyer and infantry force.  After a fierce firefight, the Americans escape and try to make their way back to their own lines to report the German surge.  En route, they stumble across a German experimental site, still smoldering with flames from some devastating event.

They come across an American OSS agent suffering from horrific burn wounds, and learn that the Germans are close to development of a super-bomb which will enable them to turn the tide of war and achieve victory. The OSS agent, knowing that he is near death, asks the soldiers to complete his mission: to find the bomb; disable it; and extract the scientist developing it, who wishes to defect. With their sergeant and other NCOs dead, the youngest of the soldiers, Nate Burrows Jr. and the more experienced Dean Ransom (a cook who had been demoted from Lieutenant after the D-Day landings) lead them deep into Nazi territory. There, they are joined by escaped British airman Brent Willoughby and Red Army soldier Ivan Puzharsky. Discovered and pursued, the Allies make a series of hair-breadth escapes from vastly superior numbers of well-armed Nazi soldiers and finally make contact with a woman named Kestrel, their link to the atomic bomb and to the scientist Dr. Luca Gruenewald.

In the end, the squad manages to escape the Nazi facility as the Allied bombers decimate the place. Ivan escaped with the documents of Gruenewald's research. The squad, Doctor Gruenenwald and Kestrel safely reach Allied-controlled territory. Nate and his squad are briefed by his superiors that they will not receive any recognitions or rewards and they must keep the secret of their mission in order to keep the secrets of the atomic bomb.

Cast

Reception 
Aaron Peck at home entertainment website High-Def Digest gave the film three stars and said: "It's a decent little DTV movie about World War II, but it isn't able to crawl out of the self-made trench of its  budget".

References

External links

2013 films
2013 direct-to-video films
Live-action films based on video games
American World War II films
Company of Heroes
Films set in Belgium
Films shot in Bulgaria
Films directed by Don Michael Paul
Films scored by Frederik Wiedmann
Ardennes in fiction
Films about Nazi Germany
Films set in Thuringia
World War II films based on actual events
2010s American films